Fall Out Boy is an American pop punk band from Wilmette, Illinois. Formed in 2001, the band is composed of vocalist and guitarist Patrick Stump, bassist Pete Wentz, guitarist Joe Trohman and drummer Andy Hurley. The group's songwriting is typically led by Wentz (lyrics) and Stump (lyrics/singing), although both Trohman and Hurley are also co-credited for the band's compositions. After a number of extended plays (EPs) and a mini album, the band released its debut full-length album Take This to Your Grave in May 2003. In the same year, the band released a cover of Jawbreaker's "Save Your Generation", as well as the Christmas-themed "Yule Shoot Your Eye Out".

In 2004 the band released three new songs on the EP My Heart Will Always Be the B-Side to My Tongue, which was followed in 2005 by second album From Under the Cork Tree. Infinity on High was released in 2007, when the band also collaborated with Timbaland on "One and Only". The following year they released a cover of Michael Jackson's "Beat It" featuring John Mayer, as well as their fourth album Folie à Deux. In 2009, Fall Out Boy went on hiatus and released the compilation album Believers Never Die.

Fall Out Boy returned in 2013 with Save Rock and Roll, which featured a range of guest contributors including Courtney Love and Elton John. Later in the year they also released PAX AM Days, a short EP influenced by the band's hardcore punk background. In 2014 the band contributed the single "Immortals" to the Big Hero 6 soundtrack, which was later featured on their sixth studio album American Beauty/American Psycho. In 2016, the group recorded a cover of the Ghostbusters theme song with Missy Elliott for the film of the same name. In 2018, the band released their 7th album, MANIA, which was their last album until 2023, when they released their 8th studio album, So Much (for) Stardust.

Songs

Footnotes

References

External links
List of Fall Out Boy songs at AllMusic
Fall Out Boy official website

Songs

Fall Out Boy